Renthendorf is a municipality in the district Saale-Holzland, in Thuringia, Germany. The ornithologist Christian Ludwig Brehm was minister in Renthendorf from 1813, and his son Alfred Brehm, also a distinguished zoologist, was born there in 1829.

References

Municipalities in Thuringia
Saale-Holzland-Kreis